Kinchit Devang Shah (born 9 December 1995) is an Indian-born Hong Kong cricketer. He is a left-handed batsman and a right-arm off break bowler. He is also an occasional wicket-keeper.

Career
Shah made his T20 cricket debut against the Canada cricket team on 15 March 2012. He made his One Day International debut for Hong Kong on 8 November 2014 against Papua New Guinea in Australia. He made his Twenty20 International debut on 24 November 2014 against Nepal in Sri Lanka.

In August 2018, Shah was named in Hong Kong's squad for the 2018 Asia Cup Qualifier tournament. Hong Kong won the qualifier tournament, and he was then named in Hong Kong's squad for the 2018 Asia Cup.

In April 2019, Shah was named in Hong Kong's squad for the 2019 ICC World Cricket League Division Two tournament in Namibia. In Hong Kong's opening match of the tournament, against Canada, Shah took a hat-trick. He was the leading wicket-taker for Hong Kong in the tournament, with eleven dismissals in six matches.

In September 2019, Shah was named in Hong Kong's squad for the 2019 ICC T20 World Cup Qualifier tournament in the United Arab Emirates. He was the leading run-scorer for Hong Kong in the tournament, with 223 runs in seven matches. In November 2019, he was named in Hong Kong's squad for the 2019 ACC Emerging Teams Asia Cup in Bangladesh. Later the same month, he was named in Hong Kong's squad for the Cricket World Cup Challenge League B tournament in Oman. In the third match of the tournament, against Bermuda, he scored his first century in List A cricket.

In May 2022, he was named in Hong Kong's side for the 2022 Uganda Cricket World Cup Challenge League B tournament.

References

External links
 

1995 births
Living people
Indian emigrants to Hong Kong
Hong Kong cricketers
Hong Kong One Day International cricketers
Hong Kong Twenty20 International cricketers
Cricketers from Mumbai
Wicket-keepers